Kevin Strange is the former president and full-time director of the MDI Biological Laboratory. Taking the role in July 2009, after a working as an NIH-funded biomedical scientist and administrator at Harvard Medical School and Vanderbilt University School of Medicine. As president, Strange worked towards refocusing the MDI Biological Laboratory's research program and recruiting multidisciplinary scientists to understand the genetic mechanisms of tissue repair, regeneration, and aging. In 2013, three years after establishing this new research focus, the MDI Biological Laboratory was recognized by the National Institutes of Health as a center of research excellence in regenerative and aging biology and medicine.

Before arriving in Maine, Strange was an associate professor at Harvard Medical School and director of the critical care research laboratories at Children's Hospital in Boston. In 1997, he moved to Vanderbilt University School of Medicine, where he was the John C. Parker Professor and director of research in the department of anesthesiology.

Strange is an expert in the field of cellular stress biology. His research focuses on how proteins are damaged by environmental stressors and how cells detect, degrade, and repair these damaged proteins. This work furthers the understanding of degenerative changes that occur as humans age. Strange has published over 125 original papers, review articles, and books. He holds bachelor's and master's degrees from the University of California at Davis and received his doctorate from the University of British Columbia.

In 2013, Strange and assistant professor Voot Yin, Ph.D., founded the MDI Biological Laboratory's first spinout company, Novo Biosciences, Inc., to accelerate the testing and development of a novel drug for patients with heart disease. That year, the magazine Mainebiz named Strange one of Maine's ten most “innovative business people” who “hold tremendous promise for the state” and its future economy. In August 2021, Voot Yin settled a case of research misconduct brought by the Office of Research Integrity without admitting or denying ORI's findings.

In 2018, Kevin Strange stepped down as president of MDI Biological Laboratory, and Hermann Haller assumed the post. In 2020, Kevin Strange left MDI Biological Laboratoy, and returned to Vanderbilt as a Professor of Anesthesiology.

References

Year of birth missing (living people)
Living people
American medical researchers
University of California, Davis alumni